Bengt Calmeyer may refer to:
 Bengt Calmeyer (musician), musician with Turbonegro
 Bengt Calmeyer (journalist) (born 1932), Norwegian journalist and novelist